Nicoară is a Romanian surname. Notable people with the surname include:

Marius Nicoară, Romanian politician 
Mona Nicoară, Romanian director and producer
Titus Nicoară (born 1988), Romanian basketball player
Viorel Nicoară (born 1987), Romanian footballer

Romanian-language surnames